Elné Owen (born 25 July 1999) is a South African professional racing cyclist, who last rode for the UCI Women's Team  during the 2019 women's road cycling season.

References

External links

1999 births
Living people
South African female cyclists
Place of birth missing (living people)
21st-century South African women